Liberal Democratic Alliance Party of Albania (in Albanian: Partia Aleanca Liberal Demokrate e Shqipërisë) is a political party in Albania, led by Pirro Prifti.

References 

Liberal parties in Albania
Political parties in Albania
Political parties with year of establishment missing